= Totano Bandai =

Totano bandai
- Union Council
- Totano Bandai
- Country: Pakistan
- Province: Khyber Pakhtunkhwa
- District: Swat

Population (2017)
  - Total: 23,808
- Time zone: UTC+5 (PST)

Totano Bandai is an administrative unit, known as Union council, of Swat District in the Khyber Pakhtunkhwa province of Pakistan.

== See also ==
- Swat District
